Aldredge is a surname. Notable people with the surname include:

Gertrude Aldredge Shelburne (1907-1993), American women's rights activist
Sawnie R. Aldredge (1890–1949), American lawyer, judge and politician
Theoni V. Aldredge (1922–2011), Greek-American costume designer
Tom Aldredge (1928–2011), American actor

See also
Aldridge (surname)